Jim Rusk is an American screenwriter. He worked as a screenwriter for television specials and movies, as his credits includes, The Nut House!!, The Lily Tomlin Show, Lily and The Lily Tomlin Special.

Rusk won two Primetime Emmys and three nominations for Outstanding Writing in a Comedy, Variety or Music from 1973 to 1976.

Filmography 
The Lily Tomlin Special (TV movie)1975 
Lily (TV movie) 1973
The Nut House!! (TV movie) 1964

References

External links 

American male screenwriters
Emmy Award winners
Possibly living people
Year of birth missing (living people)